RFA Empire Gull (L3513) was a landing ship, tank of the Royal Fleet Auxiliary. She was familiarly known as the "Black Pig" and was one of the last serving British LSTs. She was built as LST 3523, one of the Empire Ships, and later commissioned as HMS Trouncer. During the Suez Crisis she was pressed into Government service as SS Empire Gull. In 1970 she was transferred to the Royal Fleet Auxiliary as RFA Empire Gull, serving for ten years before being scrapped.

History
LST 3523 was built by Davie Shipbuilding and Repairing Co Ltd, Lauzon, Quebec, launched on 9 July 1945, and completed in October 1945. In 1947 she was commissioned as HMS Trouncer.

After spending some time mothballed on the River Clyde, she was pressed into service as SS Empire Gull during the Suez Crisis of 1956. She was operated under the management of the Atlantic Steam Navigation Company until 1961, when management passed to the British-India Steam Navigation Company. In 1970, she was transferred to the Royal Fleet Auxiliary and was renamed RFA Empire Gull, and allocated pennant number L3513. She served in the Mediterranean and later between Marchwood and Antwerp and also between Liverpool and Belfast. She was scrapped in Santander, Spain in 1980.

References

External links
 Colour photo of RFA Empire Gull
 Landing Ship Gantry/ Tank (4 images)

LST (3)-class tank landing ships
Merchant ships of the United Kingdom
Amphibious warfare vessels of the Royal Fleet Auxiliary
1945 ships
Empire ships